Mike Cooley may refer to:

 Mike Cooley (engineer) (1934–2020), Irish-born engineer and former trade union leader
 Mike Cooley (American football) (c. 1927–1988), American football player and coach
 Mike Cooley (musician), American songwriter, singer and guitarist